Hamjago is a village in the commune of Mtsamboro on Mayotte.

Populated places in Mayotte